

Brylcreem is a British brand of hair styling products for men. The first Brylcreem product was a hair cream created in 1928 by County Chemicals at the Chemico Works in Bradford Street, Birmingham, England, and is the flagship product of the brand. The cream is an emulsion of water and mineral oil stabilised with beeswax. It is notable for the high shine it provides, which spawned the name of the product, stemming from "brilliantine" and "cream".

Ownership 
The British pharmaceutical firm Beecham was the longtime owner of Brylcreem. Sara Lee acquired the personal care unit of SmithKline Beecham in June 1993. In January 2012, the global rights to the Brylcreem brand were sold by Sara Lee Corporation to Unilever.

Brylcreem is marketed in the United States by Combe Incorporated, in Europe by Unilever and in India by HUL. Before Godrej acquired a 51% stake of Sara Lee, in their joint venture Godrej Sara Lee in May 2010, the brand was distributed by Godrej in India.

Jingle

It was first advertised on television with the jingle "Brylcreem — A Little Dab'll Do Ya! Brylcreem — You'll look so debonair. Brylcreem — The gals'll all pursue ya; they'll love to run their fingers through your hair!". Another version was "Brylcreem—a little dab will do ya! Use more only if you dare; but watch out!  The gals will all pursue ya! They'll love to run their fingers through your hair!"

The jingle was created by Hanley M. Norins of the Young & Rubicam advertising agency. The television advertisement for Brylcreem included a cartoon animation of a man with (initially) shaggy hair, who happily has a little dab applied, and, miraculously, the hair combs and smooths itself.

When the dry look became popular, partly inspired by the unoiled moptops of the Beatles, the last line was changed from "They'll love to run their fingers through your hair", to "They'll love the natural look it gives your hair". Subsequent television advertisements used the mottoes "Grooms without gumming" and later, in the 1970s, in the United Kingdom and Canada, "A little dab of Brylcreem on your hair gives you the Brylcreem bounce".

Notable users and popular culture

 The Brylcreem Boys is a film from 1998, directed and co-written by Terence Ryan, about the internment of Axis and Allied combatants during World War II.
 Denis Compton, the Middlesex and England batsman and Arsenal footballer, was one of the earliest British sportsmen to make serious money from product endorsement when he advertised Brylcreem in the 1940s and 1950s.
 Waylon Jennings during his years in the Nashville sound era of his career always sported Brylcreem over the much more popular Royal Crown brand of pomade sported by friends and other stars of the scene like Johnny Cash. Waylon later ditched the style in 1972, when he began growing out his hair, which would eventually become a part of his signature style. 
 Fazal Mahmood was the first Pakistani cricketer to model for Brylcreem. It was the first time a commercial brand had hired a Pakistani cricketer as a model.
 During the Second World War, members of the RAF became known as "Brylcreem boys". Initially intended as an insult by other branches of the forces due to the RAF's perceived safe and comfortable job back in Britain, one that afforded them the luxury of personal grooming; the term became one of endearment after their success during the Battle of Britain.
 Jimmy Buffett sang the Brylcreem jingle at the end of Pencil Thin Mustache.
In the Seinfeld episode The Conversion, the balding character George Costanza mentions having Brylcreem in his medicine cabinet when discussing how people tend to hold on to older items that they may no longer need
In the HBO Mafia drama series The Sopranos, mobster Junior Soprano is being investigated for racketeering. He laments, "Federal marshals are so far up my ass I can taste Brylcreem".

Slogans
 Dipakai Pria, Disukai Wanita (Used by Men, Liked by Women)

See also
 Brilliantine
 Hair gel
 Hair wax
 Jheri curl
 Macassar oil
 Murray's Pomade
 Pomade

References

External links
 Brylcreem UK
 Brylcreem USA
 Brylcreem schoolboy meets hero Beckham to form dream team
 Birmingham's industrial history site
 Tony Gibson obituary, The Guardian.
 World War 2 adverts

Products introduced in 1928
British brands
Combe Incorporated brands
Hair care products
History of Birmingham, West Midlands
Personal care brands
Sara Lee Corporation brands
Unilever brands
Male grooming brands